Kiyama Station is the name of two train stations in Japan:

 Kiyama Station (Saga) (基山駅)
 Kiyama Station (Fukui) (気山駅)